Zlatko Đorić (born 7 September 1976) is a Serbian professional footballer who plays as a forward for Jedinstvo Banatsko Karađorđevo.

Career
Nicknamed Isus (Jesus) because of his appearance, Đorić is best remembered for his time at Budućnost Banatski Dvor, helping the club earn promotion to the First League of Serbia and Montenegro for the first time in 2003. He was also a member of the team that reached the final of the 2003–04 Serbia and Montenegro Cup.

Between 2007 and 2017, Đorić played for numerous clubs in Bosnia and Herzegovina, including Velež Mostar (Spring 2007), Laktaši (2007–August 2008), Kozara Gradiška (2008–09), Modriča (Fall 2009), Zvijezda Gradačac (Spring–Fall 2010), Rudar Prijedor (Spring–Fall 2011), Radnik Bijeljina (Spring 2012), Sloga Doboj (2012–Fall 2013), Borac Šamac (Spring–Fall 2014 and 2015–16), Rudar Ugljevik (Spring 2015), and 13 Skojevki (2016–17).

In the summer of 2017, Đorić returned to Serbia and joined Vojvodina League East club Jedinstvo Banatsko Karađorđevo, a month shy of his 41st birthday.

Statistics

Honours
Budućnost Banatski Dvor
 Serbia and Montenegro Cup: Runner-up 2003–04

References

External links
 
 
 

Association football forwards
Expatriate footballers in Bosnia and Herzegovina
First League of Serbia and Montenegro players
FK Banat Zrenjanin players
FK Borac Šamac players
FK Budućnost Banatski Dvor players
FK Kozara Gradiška players
FK Laktaši players
FK Modriča players
FK Radnik Bijeljina players
FK Rudar Prijedor players
FK Rudar Ugljevik players
FK Sloga Doboj players
FK Velež Mostar players
Kosovo Serbs
NK Zvijezda Gradačac players
People from Gjilan
Premier League of Bosnia and Herzegovina players
Serbia and Montenegro footballers
Serbian expatriate footballers
Serbian expatriate sportspeople in Bosnia and Herzegovina
Serbian footballers
Serbian SuperLiga players
1976 births
Living people
First League of the Republika Srpska players